Solvatten is a simple portable device which uses sunlight to purify water for drinking. Provided the sun is strong enough, it takes two to six hours to produce ten litres of drinking water. It works through a combination of the natural ultra-violet radiation and heat (infra-red radiation) in sunlight, and also incorporates a filter mesh.

The device is marketed by a company, Solvatten AB, founded in 2006.

The device 

The Solvatten device consists of two hinged parts which can open in the manner of a book, revealing two transparent plastic surfaces. Each half can hold five litres of water. When the device is placed in the sun, the plastic allows ultra-violet radiation to reach the water, which is also heated by the sunlight. It becomes safe to drink within two to six hours. Use of the device can reduce the use of wood to boil water, thus acting to limit deforestation and carbon dioxide emissions.

Reception 

The device has received several awards:

 2009: World Wildlife Fund, "Climate Solver"
 2011: International Green Awards, "Best Green New Product Innovation"
 2011: Swedish-American Chamber of Commerce, SACC New York-Deloitte Green Award
 2013: The Energy Globe Award Mali
 2013: Sveriges Ingenjörer, The Polhem Prize

References 

Waste treatment technology
Water treatment
Sustainable design
Solar thermal energy
Swedish inventions